Orthos can refer to:

 Orthos (skipper), a genus of butterfly in the grass skipper family
 Orthos (Thessaly), a city of ancient Thessaly, Greece
 A two-headed dog in Greek mythology, also known as Orthrus

See also
Orthros, the matins service in Eastern Christianity